A bowling green is a lawn used for playing the game of bowls.

Bowling Green may also refer to:

Places

United States 
Bowling Green, Florida
Bowling Green, Indiana
Bowling Green, Kentucky, the largest city in the United States named Bowling Green
Bowling Green, Maryland
Bowling Green, Missouri
Bowling Green (New York City), a public park in New York City
Bowling Green (IRT Lexington Avenue Line), a subway station in New York City
Bowling Green, Ohio
Bowling Green State University, Ohio
Bowling Green, Pennsylvania
Bowling Green, South Carolina, an unincorporated community
Bowling Green, Virginia, the seat of Caroline County

Germany 
Bowling Green, Wiesbaden, a park

Canada 
Bowling Green, Amaranth, Ontario
Bowling Green, Chatham-Kent, Ontario

United Kingdom 
Bowling Green, Callington, Cornwall
Bowling Green, Cornwall, Treverbyn
Bowling Green, Shropshire
Bowling Green, Worcestershire
Southampton Old Bowling Green

Music
"Bowling Green" (song), a 1967 single by The Everly Brothers
Bowling Green (album), a 1956 album of Appalachian folk music recorded by the Kossoy Sisters

Other
Bowling Green Falcons, the athletic program of Bowling Green State University
Bowling Green Hot Rods, a minor league baseball team based in the Kentucky city
Bowling Green massacre, a fictional incident referred to by Kellyanne Conway